Daniel Webster Gill (April 18, 1856 – October 27, 1933) was an American politician who served as the 23rd and 26th Mayor of Cheyenne, Wyoming and in the Wyoming Senate as a Democrat.

Early life

Daniel Webster Gill was born on April 18, 1856, in Hinsdale, Massachusetts to Bartholomew Gill and Mary Dwyer. He graduated from the Connecticut Literary Institution and being a clerk in Springfield, Massachusetts. In 1883, he moved to the Wyoming Territory and became a clerk for the Secretary of the Territory for six years. In 1890, he became involved in selling real estate in Cheyenne.

Career

He served as mayor of Cheyenne from 1903 to 1904, and again from 1913 to 1914. From 1915 to 1919, he served in the Wyoming Senate. In 1904, he was appointed as the United States commissioner for the Cheyenne district and held the position until his death.

Later life

He died at a hospital in Cheyenne, Wyoming on October 27, 1933.

References

External links

1856 births
1933 deaths
20th-century American politicians
American Freemasons
Mayors of Cheyenne, Wyoming
People from Hinsdale, Massachusetts
Democratic Party Wyoming state senators